Several peaks are named Mount Wilson or similar:

Antarctica
Mount Wilson (Antarctica)

Australia
 Wilsons Peak

Canada
 Mount Wilson (Alberta)
 Mount Wilson (British Columbia)
 Mount Wilson (Yukon)

United States